Hakob Hakobyan (born 29 March 1997) is an Armenian footballer who plays as a defensive midfielder for Ararat-Armenia and the Armenia national team.

Career

Club
On 4 July 2022, Urartu announced the departure of Hakobyan, with Ararat-Armenia announcing the signing of Hakobyan on 10 July 2022.

International
Hakobyan made his international debut for Armenia on 18 November 2020 in the UEFA Nations League against North Macedonia.

Career statistics

International

References

External links
 
 
 

1997 births
Living people
People from Samtskhe–Javakheti
Armenian footballers
Armenia youth international footballers
Armenia under-21 international footballers
Armenia international footballers
Association football midfielders
FC Urartu players
Armenian Premier League players
Armenian First League players
Georgian people of Armenian descent
Citizens of Armenia through descent
Footballers from Georgia (country)